The meridian 95° east of Greenwich is a line of longitude that extends from the North Pole across the Arctic Ocean, Asia, the Indian Ocean, the Southern Ocean, and Antarctica to the South Pole.

The 95th meridian east forms a great circle with the 85th meridian west.

From Pole to Pole
Starting at the North Pole and heading south to the South Pole, the 95th meridian east passes through:

{| class="wikitable plainrowheaders"
! scope="col" width="120" | Co-ordinates
! scope="col" | Country, territory or sea
! scope="col" | Notes
|-
| style="background:#b0e0e6;" | 
! scope="row" style="background:#b0e0e6;" | Arctic Ocean
| style="background:#b0e0e6;" |
|-valign="top"
| 
! scope="row" | 
| Komsomolets Island, Severnaya Zemlya, Krasnoyarsk Krai
|-
| style="background:#b0e0e6;" | 
! scope="row" style="background:#b0e0e6;" | Red Army Strait
| style="background:#b0e0e6;" |
|-valign="top"
| 
! scope="row" | 
| Cape October — October Revolution Island, Severnaya Zemlya, Krasnoyarsk Krai
|-
| style="background:#b0e0e6;" | 
! scope="row" style="background:#b0e0e6;" | Kara Sea
| style="background:#b0e0e6;" |
|-valign="top"
| 
! scope="row" | 
| Nordenskiöld Archipelago and Taymyr Peninsula, Krasnoyarsk Krai Tuva Republic — from 
|-
| 
! scope="row" | 
|
|-valign="top"
| 
! scope="row" | 
| Xinjiang Gansu — from  Qinghai — from  Tibet — from 
|-valign="top"
| 
! scope="row" | 
| Arunachal Pradesh — partly claimed by  Assam — from  Nagaland — from 
|-
| 
! scope="row" |  (Burma)
|
|-valign="top"
| style="background:#b0e0e6;" | 
! scope="row" style="background:#b0e0e6;" | Indian Ocean
| style="background:#b0e0e6;" | Passing just west of the islands of Breueh and Sumatra, 
|-
| style="background:#b0e0e6;" | 
! scope="row" style="background:#b0e0e6;" | Southern Ocean
| style="background:#b0e0e6;" |
|-
| 
! scope="row" | Antarctica
| Australian Antarctic Territory, claimed by 
|-
|}

e095 meridian east